Marklesburg Historic District is a national historic district located at Marklesburg in Huntingdon County, Pennsylvania. The district includes 58 contributing buildings and 1 contributing site.  The buildings primarily date between about 1845 and 1870 and include notable example of the Gothic Revival style. They are primarily of wood construction. It reflects the development of the community as a local service and commercial center for local agricultural and industrial customers.  Notable buildings include the former Town Hall, former Indian Queen Hotel, former James Creek School House, former Methodist Episcopal Church, and St. Matthew's Lutheran Church.  The Union Cemetery is the contributing site.

It was listed on the National Register of Historic Places in 1996.

References 

Historic districts on the National Register of Historic Places in Pennsylvania
Gothic Revival architecture in Pennsylvania
Historic districts in Huntingdon County, Pennsylvania
National Register of Historic Places in Huntingdon County, Pennsylvania